Bogusław Duda (born 18 July 1953) is a Polish racewalker. He competed in the men's 20 kilometres walk at the 1976 Summer Olympics.

References

1953 births
Living people
Athletes (track and field) at the 1976 Summer Olympics
Polish male racewalkers
Olympic athletes of Poland
Place of birth missing (living people)